Miguel Noguer Castellvi (born 31 December 1956) is a Spanish sailor and Olympic Champion. He competed at the 1980 Summer Olympics in Moscow and won a gold medal in the Flying Dutchman class, together with Alejandro Abascal.

References

1956 births
Living people
Spanish male sailors (sport)
Sailors at the 1980 Summer Olympics – Flying Dutchman
Sailors at the 1984 Summer Olympics – Flying Dutchman
Sailors at the 1988 Summer Olympics – Flying Dutchman
Olympic sailors of Spain
Olympic gold medalists for Spain
Olympic medalists in sailing
Medalists at the 1980 Summer Olympics